Moammareh or Moammereh may refer to:
 Moammareh, Khorramshahr
 Moammereh, Minu

See also
 Moamereh